Glenalmond or Glen Almond  is a glen which stretches for several miles to the west of the city of Perth in Perth and Kinross, Scotland and down which the River Almond flows. The upper half of the glen runs through mountainous country and is virtually uninhabited whilst the lower, easterly section of the glen is more open. The change in character takes place as the river crosses the Highland Boundary Fault, leaving the Grampian Highlands for the Central Lowlands.

A short section of Glen Almond which has a more northwesterly-southeasterly alignment is known as the Sma' Glen,. The A822 road takes advantage of this deeply incised section of the glen to forge a route between Crieff and Strathbran, much as General Wade's Military Road did in the middle of the eighteenth century.

Lower Glenalmond is the location for Glenalmond College, a private boarding school.

References 

Valleys of Perth and Kinross
Glens of Scotland
Highland Boundary Fault